2011 blackout may refer to:
2011 Chile blackout
2011 South Korea blackout
2011 Southwest blackout